Ahuacuotzingo  is one of the 81 municipalities of Guerrero, in south-western Mexico. The municipal seat lies at Ahuacuotzingo. The municipality covers an area of 388.4 km².

As of 2005, the municipality had a total population of 4,543.

References

Municipalities of Guerrero